Turistens klagan,(English: Tourist's lament) is a music album recorded by the Swedish–Dutch folk singer-songwriter Cornelis Vreeswijk in 1980. It is one half of the double concept album Felicia's svenska suite, which was originally issued only in Norway.

Track listing

"Turistens klagan" (03:21)
"Till en nymf" (02:15)
"Från en vän i viken" (02:33)
"Tre dagars blues" (04:12)
"För gröna Felicia" (02:20)
"De fattiga riddarnas ballad" (02:50)
"Polaren Pär gör sin reverens" (01:31)
"Byt nu ton" (02:05)
"Balladen om Gustava" (03:40)
"Felicia – adjö" (02:53)
"Dubbelquatrin om tennis" (03:21)
"Möte med Fredrik Åkare, Stockholm 1943" (02:52)
"Felicia pratar" (02:20)

Cornelis Vreeswijk albums
1980 albums